The Pakistan national cricket team toured Sri Lanka in January 1976 and played six matches including two internationals against the Sri Lankan national cricket team. As Sri Lanka had not then achieved Test status, the internationals are classified as first-class matches. Both games were played at the Paikiasothy Saravanamuttu Stadium in Colombo. Pakistan were captained by Intikhab Alam and Sri Lanka by Anura Tennekoon. Sri Lanka won the first by 4 wickets and Pakistan won the second by 4 wickets

References

External links
 Pakistan in Sri Lanka in 1975–76 at CricketArchive

Further reading
"Pakistan tour of Sri Lanka, 1976", Wisden 1977, pp. 929-30

1976 in Pakistani cricket
1976 in Sri Lankan cricket
1976
International cricket competitions from 1975–76 to 1980
Sri Lankan cricket seasons from 1972–73 to 1999–2000